Terminal USA is a controversial 1994 film by Jon Moritsugu that explores themes of family, drugs, violence and Asian American stereotypes, and now considered a cult film. Its run time is 54 minutes and it is estimated to have had a budget of $360,000.

Plot
On his way out the door, Katsumi is stopped by his mother, telling him the exciting news that he got his acceptance letter to the local community college, but Katsumi tells her he doesn't care. Ma tells Katsumi he should be more like his other siblings: Holly, the popular cheerleader, and Marvin, the studious nerd. In the middle of their conversation, Holly gets a phone call from Muffy that she has written a letter to the principal to get their rival Sally kicked off the cheerleading squad, and signed Holly's name on it. A wealthy lawyer named Tom Sawyer shows up to announce that he has proof that the family's bed-ridden Grandpa was exposed to deadly chemicals by his former employer, but that they need Grandpa to be dead before they can cash out on their claim. Ma promises Grandpa that she would never kill him for money. Holly lures Tom Sawyer into the bathroom and "sharpens his pencil". Katsumi meets up with his girlfriend Eightball to sell some drugs, but when they meet with Fagtoast, he shoots Katsumi in the leg. Dad comes home from work complaining about a racist letter from his coworkers, but he's optimistic because he's certain the apocalypse is very near, and his very pure family will certainly be spared.

Holly gets a call from Tom Sawyer asking her to come on a trip with him to New York, which she agrees to, and then another call from her boyfriend Rex, whom she tells that she thinks she might be pregnant. Sally is furious about getting kicked off the cheerleading squad, and she vows to get revenge on Holly: she calls Ma and asks if she can throw a surprise party at Holly's house to show the cheerleading blooper video, and Ma happily agrees. Eightball and the wounded Katsumi arrive home, but he asks Eightball to go back out to get the money that Fagtoast owes them. She uses her ray gun to get all the money and drugs that Fagtoast is carrying on him, but he follows her back to Katsumi's house. Dad walks in on Marvin looking at a gay porno magazine and freaks out, calling him "the pervert in the backroom". To calm himself, Marvin takes some of Katsumi's cocaine.

Sally and the other cheerleaders arrive to watch the special videotape, which is actually a secret sex tape that Holly and Rex recorded. Holly comes downstairs just as it is starting, and Ma is disturbed by the video. Suddenly a pair of skinheads light fire to a cross in the front yard, and barge into the house: they're looking for Katsumi, who owes them money. Marvin is high on coke and excited to see a skinhead just like in his magazine, but when he tries to touch him, the skinhead punches him in the face. Just as Dad is about to murder Grandpa, he hears the commotion in the living room, runs in, and shoots one of the skinheads. Upstairs, Fagtoast threatens to shoot Katsumi and Eightball, but Katsumi dies of blood loss before he pulls the trigger. Eightball stabs Fagtoast in the eye, and then messages her mothership that her research mission is now complete, and she will bring her specimen with her: she and Katsumi's body are teleported away.

Tom Sawyer's car pulls up outside, and Holly runs out to meet him, knocking into Rex who has furiously biked to profess his love for her. She decides to get in the car with Tom Sawyer instead, and they drive away for New York where he plans to traffic her into child sex pornography.

Cast
 Sharon Omi - Ma
 Ken Narasaki - Dad
 Kenny Lang - Grandpa
 Jenny Woo - Holly
 Jon Moritsugu - Marvin/Katsumi
 Amy Davis - Eightball
 Victor of Aquitaine - Tom Sawyer the Lawyer
 Timothy Innes - Fagtoast
 Peter Friedrich - Rex
 Bonnie Dickenson - Sally
 Jacques Boyreau - Tabitha the Skinhead
 Gregg Turkington - Six
 Elizabeth Canning - Muffy
 Joshua Pollock - Pizzaboy
 Lady - Hot Lust Operator
 Issa Bowser - Buffy (Head Cheerleader)
 Kathleen Blihar - Cheerleader
 Tami Lipsey - Cheerleader
 Desi Del Valle

Beginnings and controversy 
Terminal USA started out as an entry for a script competition for PBS. The script won $12,000 from that competition and the film was shown on television and created quite an uproar. "I was pushing the envelope trying to get crazy shit on TV," Moritsugu said in an interview. "For a while we thought we were going to get a lawsuit. The producer said, ‘Let's work it. This is our publicity." After filming was complete, Moritsugu described the process as "the most disgusting, worst way to make a movie, with that much money and that many people around." When people were questioning the National Endowment for the Arts for funding projects considered controversial, Terminal USA was one of the films used as an example for one of the controversial projects funded. The film's controversy continued when it aired on PBS in 1994, and only 150 of the 210 PBS stations agreed to air it.

Release and reception
The film premiered at Rotterdam Film Festival on February 2, 1994, and played at numerous other film festivals, winning awards at Rotterdam and the Toronto International Film Festival. A censored version premiered on television on November 23, 1994, which blurred some gory images and bleeped out some words: even words that were completely appropriate for television, because Moritsugu wanted to make a statement about censorship. A completely uncensored 57 minute version of the film was first screened in 1995 at the San Francisco Cinematheque. Terminal USA was almost put on Japan/US flights for Northwest Airlines, but they decided against it at the last minute. It was released on DVD in 2009.

When the film debuted, David Rooney of Variety wrote, "this rambunctious volley of flagrantly tasteless humor could whip up a minor cult following, especially in the U.K. and Europe" and added that "frivolous sex and gore content is far from explicit, and hard to take offense at." Entertainment Weekly's Ken Tucker  described the film as "intentionally ugly and crude: it focuses on a squabbling, drug-taking Asian-American clan that gives new meaning to the term dysfunctional". In the Los Angeles Times, Howard Rosenberg wrote that the film is an "amusing, self-bleeping, self-mocking soap opera whose politically incorrect Asian family communicates mostly through ribaldry and spermspeak", and made reference to the public funding controversy by mentioning that "some members of Congress need to rethink their notion of public TV".

In her book Making Asian American Film and Video: History, Institutions, Movements, Jun Okada describes the film as "an acerbic, black satire about a Japanese American family on the verge of post-apocalyptic meltdown", and that "unlike the serious historical documentaries that form the basis for the genre [of Asian American films], Terminal USA delves in abject imagery and parody in order to emphasize the absurdity of 'positive image'." Mike Hale, writing for the New York Times, echoed that thought: compared to the sitcom All-American Girl that debuted shortly after, Terminal USA is a "much more entertaining and in its way much more authentic depiction of Asian-American family life — a view from the inside that made its way onto television and gleefully trashed the notion of Asian-Americans as a 'model minority'."

Festivals and awards
The film played at the following festivals
Museum of Modern Art
Toronto International Film Festival
Rotterdam Film Festival
Gothenburg Film Festival
Copenhagen International Film Festival
Vienna International Film Festival
Musée d'Art Moderne de la Ville de Paris
Institute of Contemporary Arts
Yerba Buena Center for the Arts
San Francisco Asian American Film Festival
Seattle Asian American Film Festival

References

External links 
 
 Official website

Comedy films about Asian Americans
Films about dysfunctional families
Films produced by Andrea Sperling
Films about Japanese Americans
Teensploitation
1990s English-language films
1990s American films